Dark blue can refer to:
 Dark blue (color), a variant of the color blue
 Dark Blue (film), a 2002 film directed by Ron Shelton and starring Kurt Russell
 "Dark Blue" (song), a song by the American piano rock band Jack's Mannequin
 Dark Blue (TV series), a 2009 TV series on TNT
 Dark Blue, the original name of the supergroup Dark New Day
 "Dark Blue" (Voltron Force), the ninth episode of the 2011 television series
 "Dark Blue", a song by No Doubt from the 2000 album Return of Saturn
 The Dark Blue, a 19th-century literary magazine